Chongqing noodles is a term for a variety of spicy noodle dishes that originated and exist in Chongqing, China, which are collectively referred to as xiǎomiàn, literally "little noodles" in English. Xiao mian is also prepared in other areas of the world, such as the United Kingdom and areas of Australia and the United States.

Overview
Xiao mian is a traditional breakfast dish in Chongqing that is widely consumed by Chongqing residents. The dishes are typically low-priced, and are a common street food in Chongqing. It has been described as a staple food of Chongqing, and is an historic part of the cuisine there. It is widely available in Chongqing restaurants.

Xiao mian noodles are typically prepared using wheat. There are two main types of xiao mian dishes: noodles with soup and noodles without soup. Chongqing noodle dishes are typically spicy and prepared using a variety of spices, seasonings and sauces. Sichuan pepper is often used in the dish's preparation. Myriad meats and vegetables are also used in its preparation. Various garnishes and condiments are also used, such as spring onions and chili oil.

See also 

 A Bite of China
 Chinese cuisine 
 Chinese noodles
 Chongqing hot pot
 Dandan noodles
 List of Chinese dishes
 List of noodle dishes
 List of street foods
 Noodle soup
 Sichuan cuisine

References

Further reading

External links
 
 

Chinese noodles
Chongqing cuisine